This was the first edition of the tournament.

Gong Maoxin and Yi Chu-huan won the title after defeating Hsieh Cheng-peng and Wu Di 2–6, 6–1, [10–5] in the final.

Seeds

Draw

References
 Main Draw

Zhuhai Challenger - Doubles
Zhuhai Open